HaSolelim is a kibbutz in northern Israel. Located near Kiryat Tiv'on, Nazareth and Shefa-'Amr, it falls under the jurisdiction of Jezreel Valley Regional Council.

History
The nearby Palestinian town of Saffuriya had been almost emptied of its 4,000 inhabitants in July 1948. By early January, 1949, about  500 inhabitants had filtered back, but "neighbouring settlements coveted Saffuriya lands". The "Northern Front" ordered their eviction, which was carried out the 7 January 1949. From  February and onwards in the same year, the land of Saffuriya was distributed to neighbouring Jewish settlements. 

The kibbutz HaSolelim  was established in July 1949, with the name symbolising the wishes of the founders to pave the way for new settlements in the Land of Israel. 3,795 dunams of Saffuriya's land  was given to HaSolelim in late 1949. HaSolelim is located west of the Saffuriya site.

References 

Kibbutzim
Populated places established in 1949
Populated places in Northern District (Israel)
1949 establishments in Israel